Pridvorica is a village in Serbia located in the municipality of Bojnik and the district of Jablanica. In 2002, it had 951 inhabitants, of which 919 were Serbs (96.63%) and 30 Romani (3.15%).

The village of Pridvorica is on the banks of the Pusta River, a tributary of the Južna Morava.

References

Populated places in Jablanica District